FC Balashikha is a Russian football team based in Balashikha.

Club history
The club was founded in 2008 and played on the amateur levels. For the 2022–23 season, the club was licensed for the third-tier Russian Second League.

Current squad
As of 22 February 2023, according to the Second League website.

References

Association football clubs established in 2008
Football clubs in Russia
Football in Moscow Oblast
2008 establishments in Russia